West Durham Historic District is a national historic district located at Durham, Durham County, North Carolina. The district encompasses 101 contributing buildings in a mixed industrial, commercial, and residential section of Durham. The buildings primarily date after 1892 and include notable examples of Classical Revival, Italianate, and Queen Anne architecture.  Located in the district is the separately listed Erwin Cotton Mills Company Mill No. 1 Headquarters Building.  Other notable buildings include Erwin Cotton Mills Co. Mill No. 4 (1909–10), Erwin Cotton Mills Co. worker's housing (1910s), Fidelity Bank (1920s), E. K. Powe School (1928), Blacknall Memorial Presbyterian Church (1922), and St. Joseph's Episcopal Church.

It was listed on the National Register of Historic Places in 1986.

References

Historic districts on the National Register of Historic Places in North Carolina
Queen Anne architecture in North Carolina
Neoclassical architecture in North Carolina
Italianate architecture in North Carolina
Historic districts in Durham, North Carolina
National Register of Historic Places in Durham County, North Carolina
Neighborhoods in Durham, North Carolina